The Bard Free Press (the Free Press) is a monthly college newspaper published by students of Bard College, a private liberal arts college in Annandale-on-Hudson, New York. The paper has a circulation of about 2,000 and is the only printed student newspaper at Bard. The paper was founded in 2000, by former student editors of The Observer, Bard's newspaper at the time. The Free Press and the Bard Observer merged in 2008.

To match the content with the form, issues of The Free Press are not organized according to traditional categories, sections, or columns. The articles, reports, investigations, think-pieces, and interviews are arranged and formatted differently for each issue. This fluid approach to formatting allows the editors to illustrate themes and craft cogent narratives that a traditional newspaper couldn't.

The Free Press is run entirely by Bard College undergraduates, and has no faculty advisor. All decisions on its content and operations are made by editors.

The newspaper does not accept outside advertisements or announcements from student clubs or programs. The newspaper is financed through Bard's Convocation Fund, a collective percentage of each student's tuition. Like all charter clubs at the college, the paper's budget is determined annually by an elected student body, and cannot be reduced during the biannual budget forum.

In 2013, the Bard Free Press won a Best in Show title from the Associated Collegiate Press. In 2014, the Free Press received first place for design and second place for feature story by the New York Press Association awards. The judges awarding the design prize said of the publication, "Brilliant design and layout. It felt like reading art."

In February 2017, under direction of a new editorial team, the Free Press shifted its focus towards hard-hitting, investigative reporting. The current iteration of the newspaper-turned-magazine incorporates media analysis and critique to contextualize their reporting.

History
The first issue of the Bard Free Press was printed on March 14, 2000. At the time, another student newspaper already existed, The Observer, which had been a campus publication since 1961. According to the Free Press Mission of Purpose, the paper "was founded by former members of the Bard Observer staff––the managing editor, section editors and contributors––who were dissatisfied with the quality of student journalism at Bard." Initially, the Free Press focused on world news, U.S. politics, and student editorials. In 2003, SPIN Magazine recognized the Free Press as the “Best Campus Publication” in their First Annual SPIN Campus Awards.

The Free Press merged with the Observer in 2008, in conjunction with a major redesign that departed from a traditional tabloid format.

In 2012, the Free Press launched an online  site, used to publish articles, videos, student artwork, and a full issue archive. The paper hosts the site, and uses a domain, independent from Bard College.

Format
The Free Press began as a newspaper, then shifted towards a tabloid format. In March 2016, the Free Press became a glossy magazine. Beginning in February 2017, the publication abandoned recurring columns and sections in favor of a more fluid structure that varies issue by issue. The paper is published once a month, and distributed throughout Bard's campus, and  nearby towns Tivoli and Red Hook, New York.

References

Bard College
Student newspapers published in New York (state)
Educational institutions established in 2000
2000 establishments in New York (state)